Devi's Falls is a waterfall located at Pokhara in Kaski District, Nepal.

The water forms a tunnel after reaching the bottom. On 31 July 1961, a Swiss couple went swimming but the woman drowned in a pit because of the overflow. Her body was recovered three days later in river Phusre with great effort. Her father wished to name it "David's falls" after her daughter's name but changed to Devi's Fall. Its Nepali name is Patale Chango, which literal meaning is Paatal  Ko Chango means "Underworld's Waterfall". This is one of the most visited places in Nepal.

After exiting the tunnel, the water passes through a cave called Gupteshwor Mahadev Cave or "cave beneath the ground". The Phewa Lake dam is the water source of this falls. The cave  also acts as a tourism site because it has complex designs and people even forget the way inside the cave.
‍‍‍‍‍‍‌‌‌‍‍‍

Tourism
It is an attraction for tourists and locals. Thousands of Nepalis visit for recreation and enjoyment. Visitors can try their luck on the luck pond constructed there by throwing and placing the coin on the statue of God. Likewise, one can find a model of traditional typical Nepali house and a series of statue of Nepali people wearing traditional dresses where visitors can click photo.

Gallery

See also
List of waterfalls of Nepal

References

Waterfalls of Nepal
Geography of Pokhara